East Quantoxhead is a village in the district of Somerset West and Taunton,  from West Quantoxhead,  east of Williton, and  west of Bridgwater, within the Quantock Hills Area of Outstanding Natural Beauty in Somerset, England.

History

Above the village at Black Ball Camp are an Iron Age hill fort and evidence of Bronze Age burials.

The parish of East Quantoxhead was part of the Williton and Freemanners Hundred.

The village has a manor house, thatched cottages, medieval tithe barn, its own duck pond and mill house dating from 1725. The manor house known, as Court House, has a medieval tower and other parts of the building which date from the 17th century. It has been designated as a grade I listed building. The manor was granted to Ralph Pagnall after the Norman Conquest passing down through generations to the Luttrells. No part of the estate has been sold since its grant around 1070 and is still owned by the descendants of the Paganel and Luttrell families. This required a special act of parliament in the 1920s to enable council houses to be built on land which was not freehold, contrary to the rules in the rest of the country.

The village used to have a small harbour which brought in limestone for local limekilns and exported alabaster. It is thought that it was also used for smuggling.

At some time before 1725 Perry Hill was the site of a copper mine.

Governance

The parish council has responsibility for local issues, including setting an annual precept (local rate) to cover the council's operating costs and producing annual accounts for public scrutiny. The parish council evaluates local planning applications and works with the local police, district council officers, and neighbourhood watch groups on matters of crime, security, and traffic. The parish council's role also includes initiating projects for the maintenance and repair of parish facilities, as well as consulting with the district council on the maintenance, repair, and improvement of highways, drainage, footpaths, public transport, and street cleaning. Conservation matters (including trees and listed buildings) and environmental issues are also the responsibility of the council.

The village falls within the non-metropolitan district of Somerset West and Taunton, which was established on 1 April 2019. It was previously in the district of West Somerset, which was formed on 1 April 1974 under the Local Government Act 1972, and part of Williton Rural District before that. The district council is responsible for local planning and building control, local roads, council housing, environmental health, markets and fairs, refuse collection and recycling, cemeteries and crematoria, leisure services, parks, and tourism.

Somerset County Council is responsible for running the largest and most expensive local services such as education, social services, libraries, main roads, public transport, policing and fire services, trading standards, waste disposal and strategic planning.

It is also part of the Bridgwater and West Somerset county constituency represented in the House of Commons of the Parliament of the United Kingdom. It elects one member of parliament (MP) by the first past the post system of election, and was part of the South West England constituency of the European Parliament prior to Britain leaving the European Union in January 2020, which elected seven MEPs using the d'Hondt method of party-list proportional representation.

Religious sites

The church is dedicated to St Mary, and parts date back to the 14th century. There is a canonical sundial on the south wall. The wooden pulpit dates from 1633. The church has been designated by English Heritage as a Grade II* listed building.

Notable inhabitants

The village was the birthplace of Sarah Biffen (October 1784 – 2 October 1850), a Victorian English painter born with no arms. The village was also home to Walter Luttrell a local landowner and veteran of World War II who donated Dunster Castle to the National Trust and was appointed Lord Lieutenant of Somerset.

References

Villages in West Somerset
Ports and harbours of Somerset
Civil parishes in Somerset
Populated coastal places in Somerset
Beaches of Somerset